Trueshan (foaled 24 February 2016) is a French-bred, British-trained Thoroughbred racehorse who specialises in races over extended distances. He finished unplaced in his only race as a two-year-old in 2018 but won four of his five starts in the following year and made further improvement as a four-year-old when he took the Listed Tapster Stakes and the Group 2 British Champions Long Distance Cup. In 2021 he recorded Group 1 victories in the Goodwood Cup and Prix du Cadran as well as a second British Champions Long Distance Cup.

Background
Trueshan is a bay horse with a small white star bred in France by Didier Blot. As a yearling in 2017 he was consigned to the Osarus September Yearling Sale and was bought for €8,000 by Pegasus Bloodstock. In May 2018 he was put up for auction at the Tattersalls Guineas Breeze-Up Sale and was purchased for 31,000 guineas by the trainer Alan King and Highflyer Bloodstock. He was taken into training by King at Barbury Castle, Wiltshire and raced in the ownership of Singula Partnership. He was gelded before the start of his racing career.

He was from the second crop of foals sired by Planteur who won the Prix Ganay in 2011. 
Trueshan's dam Shao Line showed modest ability on the track, winning one minor race in France from six attempts. As a descendant of the Poule d'Essai des Pouliches winner Altissima she was distantly related to Cape Verdi, Arcangues, Aquarelliste and Tawkeel.

Racing career

2018: two-year-old season
On his racecourse debut Trueshan started at odds of 20/1 for a maiden race over eight and a half furlongs on soft ground at Nottingham Racecourse on 17 October when he came home sixth of the nine runners behind Dubai Icon, beaten seven and three quarter lengths by the winner.

2019: three-year-old season
After an absence of over nine months, Trueshan began his second campaign in a novice race (for horses with no more than two previous wins) over one and a half miles on the synthetic Tapeta at Wolverhampton Racecourse on 2 August. Ridden by Hollie Doyle he went off a 33/1 outsider but overcame a slow start to record his first victory as he caught Caravan of Hope on the line to win by a short head. Doyle was again in the saddle when Trueshan followed up in a similar event on turf at Ffos Las Racecourse, winning "comfortably" by two and three quarter lengths from Caravan of Hope. He was then moved up in distance for a Handicap race over fourteen furlongs at Haydock Park on 7 September and finished second of the twelve runners behind Ranch Hand. On 11 October Trueshan was assigned a weight of 126 pounds for the Old Rowley Cup Handicap over one and half miles at Newmarket Racecourse when he was ridden by William Buick. He started the 13/2 favourite in a nineteen-runner field and won "readily" by almost four lengths after taking the lead approaching the final furlong. On his final run of the season Trueshan, ridden by Buick, won a conditions race at Newbury Racecourse two weeks late, getting the better of a sustained struggle with the odds-on favourite Hamish to prevail by a neck.

2020: four-year-old season
The 2020 flat racing season in Britain was disrupted by the COVID-19 pandemic with racing being suspended in spring before resuming in June. On his seasonal debut, Trueshan was moved up in class for the Listed Buckhounds Stakes, which was run that year at Newmarket on 7 June, and came home fourth of the ten runners, beaten just over three lengths by the winner Dashing Willoughby. Ten days later the gelding was ridden by Martin Harley when he went off the 5/4 favourite for the Listed Tapster Stakes over one and a half miles at Haydock. After being restrained towards the rear of the seven-runner field he moved up to dispute the lead in the straight and got the better of a "sustained duel" with the Michael Stoute-trained Alignak to win by a short head. At York Racecourse in August Trueshan was assigned a weight of 135 pounds for the Ebor Handicap and finished eighth behind the six-year-old Fujaira Prince after struggling to obtain a clear run in the straight. The gelding returned to winning form at Salisbury Racecourse on 11 September as he defeated Withhold by a length in the Persian Punch Stakes over fourteen furlongs after taking the lead a furlong from the finish.

Hollie Doyle resumed her partnership with Trueshan when the gelding was stepped up to Group 2 class to contest the British Champions Long Distance Cup over two miles on soft ground at Ascot Racecourse on 17 October and started at odds of 11/1. Stradivarius started favourite while the other eleven runners included Search For A Song, Sovereign, Fujaira Prince and Broome. After racing in mid-division for most of the way Trueshan made a forward move entering the straight, gained the advantage a furlong out and drew right away in the closing stages to win "easily" by seven and a half lengths from Search For A Song. Alan King commented "We'd hope he would run well but we weren't expecting something like that... but obviously the step up in trip suited him and we know he does handle that ground... We'll put him away for the winter now and look forward to next summer", while Hollie Doyle said "The further I was going, the better, and he was tanking with me—he went through the ground like a tractor, he loved it."

In the 2020 World's Best Racehorse Rankings, Trueshan was rated on 118, making him the 80th best racehorse in the world and the second best horse over extended distances.

2021: five-year-old season
Trueshan began his fourth season in the Group 3 Ormonde Stakes over thirteen furlongs at Chester Racecourse on 6 May and finished second to the Aidan O'Brien-trained favourite Japan, beaten three-quarters of a length by the winner. In June he was expected to contest the Ascot Gold Cup but bypassed the race as King felt that the ground would have been too firm, and was instead dropped back to handicap class for the Northumberland Plate at Newcastle Racecourse. Carrying top weight of 139 pounds and ridden by the apprentice jockey Rhys Clutterbuck he started favourite but came home sixth of the twenty runners behind the 33/1 outsider Nicholas T. 

Trueshan made his first appearance in a Group 1 race when he was partnered by Doyle in the Goodwood Cup over two miles at Goodwood Racecourse on 27 July. With Stradivarius being withdrawn on account of the soft ground Trueshan started the 6/5 favourite in an eight-runner field which included Serpentine, Santiago, Sir Ron Priestley (Princess of Wales's Stakes), Amhran Na Bhfiann (Curragh Cup). After tracking the leader Nayef Road, Trueshan took the lead in the straight as the field tracked over to race up the stands side (the left side from the jockeys' viewpoint). He "kept on strongly" in the closing stages and won by almost four lengths from the outsider Away He Goes, with Sir Ron Priestley a further length and a half back in third place. After the race Doyle said "I was very confident... he's exceptionally talented on this ground. There was no gallop and I expected a bit of pace so halfway round I thought, 'I'm going to do something about this', as I didn't want to get caught on the rail – he just went when he hit the rising ground."

After a break of more than two months Trueshan was sent to France to contest the Group 1 Prix du Cadran over 4000 metres at Longchamp Racecourse on 2 October. Ridden by James Doyle (Hollie Doyle was serving a suspension) he went off the 1.6/1 favourite against twelve opponents including Stradivarius, Princess Zoe, Skazino (Prix Kergorlay), Call The Wind (winner of the race in 2018) and Bubble Smart (Prix Gladiateur). In a race run in heavy rain Trueshan settled in mid-division as the outsider Alkuin set the pace from Bubble Smart, before moving into contention approaching the final turn. He gained the advantage from Stradivarius 400 metres from the finish and drew away in the closing stages to win by four and a half lengths. James Doyle commented "He stays all day and has a good kick on this ground as well... Hollie has been a big part of this horse's career and to miss out today through suspension is pretty tough."

Two weeks later at Ascot, with Hollie Doyle back in the saddle, Trueshan attempted to repeat his 2020 success in the British Champions Long Distance Cup and started even money favourite in a ten-runner field. Stradivarius was again in opposition while the best fancied of the other contenders were Hamish (who had returned from a long absence to win the September Stakes) and Baron Samedi (Belmont Gold Cup Stakes). After tracking the leaders he moved up on the outside on the final turn, overtook the front-running The Mediterranean two furlongs out and held off a sustained challenge from the outsider Tashkhan to win by one and a half lengths, with a further two and a half lengths back to Stradivarius in third. Alan King commented "He was quite a handful to saddle and quite hot. I don't think he was at his best but I think we got away with it today, but only just. He had to be very brave today."

On 10 November Trueshan was named Champion Stayer at the Cartier Racing Awards.

Pedigree

References

2016 racehorse births
Racehorses bred in France
Racehorses trained in the United Kingdom
Thoroughbred family 8-f
Cartier Award winners